Novokhopyorsky/Novokhopersky (masculine), Novokhopyorskaya/Novokhoperskaya (feminine), or Novokhopyorskoye/Novokhoperskoye (neuter) may refer to:
Novokhopyorsky District, a district of Voronezh Oblast, Russia
Novokhopyorsky (urban locality), an urban locality (a work settlement) in Voronezh Oblast, Russia